Petra Klosová (born 16 April 1986) is a Czech swimmer who specialized in freestyle and backstroke events. She is a two-time Olympian and a multiple-time national champion and record holder for the freestyle and backstroke events (50, 100, and 200 m).

Olympic participation
Klosová made her first Czech team, as an eighteen-year-old, at the 2004 Summer Olympics in Athens, where she competed in the women's 4 × 100 m freestyle relay, along with her fellow swimmers Jana Myšková, Sandra Kazíková, and Ilona Hlaváčková. Swimming the second leg, Klosová recorded a split of 56.49 seconds, and the Czech team went to finish heat one in seventh place, and thirteenth overall, for a total time of 3:46.83.

At the 2008 Summer Olympics in Beijing, Klosová competed as an individual swimmer in the 100 m backstroke. Leading up to her second Games, she cleared a FINA B-cut of 1:02.98 at the Missouri Grand Prix in Columbia, Missouri. She challenged seven other swimmers in the third heat, including 14-year-old Sarah Sjöström of Sweden, and three-time Olympian Sherry Tsai of Hong Kong. She raced to sixth place by six tenths of a second (0.6) behind Mexico's Fernanda González, with a time of 1:02.76. Klosová failed to advance into the semifinals, as she placed thirty-ninth overall in the preliminaries.

Club swimming
Klosová was also a member of the SMU Mustangs swimming and diving team, and a graduate of international studies at Southern Methodist University in Dallas, Texas. She was a member of the Kopřivnice swimming team, but changed clubs to swim with Nový Jičín in 2011. She retired from competitive swimming in May 2012.

References

External links
Player Bio – SMU Mustangs
NBC 2008 Olympics profile

1986 births
Living people
Czech female swimmers
Olympic swimmers of the Czech Republic
Swimmers at the 2004 Summer Olympics
Swimmers at the 2008 Summer Olympics
Czech female freestyle swimmers
Female backstroke swimmers
SMU Mustangs women's swimmers
Sportspeople from Nový Jičín